Sackett's Wells is a former settlement in Imperial County, California.

History
The springs were probably used as a watering place by local indigenous peoples of California, and in the latter 18th century by colonial Spanish and Mexican explorers from the Viceroyalty of New Spain to Las Californias province, and 19th century Mexican settlers and travelers from Sonora to Alta California.

American period
They were certainly used from the time of the Mexican American War when they were a watering place for the expeditions of Kearny and Cooke, and other travelers crossing the Colorado Desert westward from the Colorado River.  When the Southern Emigrant Trail was established from the Yuma Crossing to Los Angeles, they were one of the watering places used.

John Russell Bartlett, described Sackett's Wells in his 1854 book A Personal Narrative of Explorations and Incidents in Texas, New Mexico, California, Sonora and Chihuahua:

Butterfield Overland Mail station

At the beginning of the American Civil War the mail stations were abandoned but the wells continued to be used by the Union Army and other travelers.  After the Civil War Sackett's Wells was again used for a station and watering place for other stage companies on the route between California and Arizona Territory, until the route fell into disuse in the late 1870s with the arrival of the railroad in Yuma, Arizona.  The site now is now obscured by the effects of 135 years of time, decay, and erosion in the desert.

In Popular Literature
The author Louis L'Amour, known for his stories and novels about the Old West, refers to Sackett's Well in his book The Sackett Companion. Many of his books tell stories about different fictional members of the Sackett family as they immigrate from England to The New World and settle, then move west as the narratives progress in time. Because of the interest that his fans held for the Sackett family, he wrote The Sackett Companion to help his readers understand the many relationships and events involving this family. Mr. L'Amour states that he took the family name from Sackett's Well.

In The Sackett Companion, Mr. L'Amour tells that he had occasion to search for and locate Sackett's Well. He states that Arthur Woodward credited the well's name to Russell Sackett, a stageline station keeper. But Mr. L'Amour believed the water hole was discovered by Lt. Delos B. Sackett, thus saving his expedition's mules.

See also

References

Former settlements in Imperial County, California
Butterfield Overland Mail in California
History of Imperial County, California
Populated places in the Colorado Desert
Springs of California
1858 establishments in California
American frontier
Former populated places in California
Stagecoach stops in the United States